Elizabeth Porter may refer to:

Elizabeth Porter (died 1752), known as "Tetty", wife of Samuel Johnson, an English writer
Elizabeth Porter Phelps (1747–1817), important diarist from Massachusetts
Elizabeth W. Porter (born 1964), member of the Florida House of Representatives

and hetty lollie